This is a list of the members of the Dewan Negara (Senate) of the Twelfth Parliament of Malaysia.

Elected by the State Legislative Assembly

Nominated by the Prime Minister and appointed by the Yang di-Pertuan Agong

Death in office
 Vijayaratnam Seevaratnam (d. 3 November 2008)
 Lee Sing Chooi (d. 9 December 2008)
 Ismail Md. Salleh (d. 27 August 2009)
 Subbaiyah Palaniappan (d. 18 April 2012)

Footnotes

References

12th Parliament of Malaysia
Lists of members of the Dewan Negara